Judge Turpin (also known as Lord Turpin) is a fictional character in some adaptations of the story Sweeney Todd. He is the main antagonist, who imprisons Benjamin Barker on a false charge, rapes Barker's wife Lucy, and takes Barker's daughter Johanna as his ward.

In various productions of the musical, Turpin has been portrayed by actors including Edmund Lyndeck, Ken Howard, and Alan Rickman.

Earlier versions
In early versions of the Sweeney Todd legend, Todd himself is the primary antagonist, and no character equivalent to Judge Turpin appears. The original story "The String of Pearls" features a "Mr. Lupin," an older man with an eye to marry Johanna "Oakley" with the approval of the girl's mother, but his role is a supporting one and he has no personal connection to Sweeney Todd, who is a murderous thief without any given past. In the Tod Slaughter film, it is Sweeney Todd himself lusting after the young Johanna. It would not be until Christopher Bond wrote his 1973 play Sweeney Todd: The Demon Barber of Fleet Street that the character of Judge Turpin would emerge.

In Sweeney Todd
In Bond's play and its subsequent adaptations by Stephen Sondheim and Tim Burton, Judge Turpin is first seen having Benjamin Barker arrested and exiled to Australia in order to have Barker's wife, Lucy, all to himself. Lucy is heartbroken and becomes a recluse, never coming down from her house. Judge Turpin continuously pursues her, sending her flowers each day. He sends his henchman, Beadle Bamford, to summon her to his home,"Blaming himself for her dreadful plight." He then rapes Lucy, who tries to kill herself by drinking poison; she survives, but is driven insane and reduced to begging in the street. Turpin then takes Barker's infant daughter, Johanna, and raises her as his ward. He keeps her locked away from the world and spies on her through a peep-hole in her wall. When Johanna turns 16, Turpin offers her his hand in marriage. She refuses, to which he seems baffled. When he spots Anthony Hope looking at Johanna, he has him beaten and threatens to kill him if he ever returns.

On Beadle Bamford's advice, he goes for a shave at Sweeney Todd's barber shop, in order to impress Johanna—unaware that Todd is in fact Barker, returned from Australia and seeking revenge. Todd is about to cut Turpin's throat when he is interrupted by Anthony, who reveals Johanna's plan to escape. Turpin promptly leaves, renouncing Todd's business. Turpin returns home and finds Johanna smitten with Anthony. He sends her away to an asylum, planning to keep her there until she agrees to marry him.

Turpin receives a letter claiming that Johanna has repented, unaware that it is part of a trap laid by Todd. Following the direction of the letter, goes to Todd's shop, where he is persuaded to have a shave. Turpin soon realizes Todd's true identity, and Todd slits his throat and drops him down a chute leading to his accomplice Mrs. Lovett's basement, where he bleeds to death.

Songs
In the musical Judge Turpin sings only one song by himself. The tracks were all composed by Stephen Sondheim:
 "Prologue: The Ballad of Sweeney Todd" (with Company)**
 "The Ballad of Sweeney Todd (Reprise 1)" (with Company)**
 "Johanna (Mea Culpa)" (Solo) **
 "Kiss Me (Part II/Quartet)" (with Johanna, Anthony and Beadle Bamford)**
 "Pretty Women (part 1 and 2)" (with Sweeney Todd)
 "The Judge's Return" (with Sweeney Todd)
 "The Ballad of Sweeney Todd (Epilogue)" (with Company)**

(* Edited for 2007 film)
(** Cut from 2007 film)

Performers
Edmund Lyndeck played Judge Turpin in the original 1979 production of Sondheim's musical.
Xavier Ribera-Vall played the role in Mario Gas's version (1995-1997 and 2009-2012) 
Alan Rickman played the role in Tim Burton's 2007 film adaptation of Sondheim's musical.
Timothy Nolen played the role in 2001.
Mark Jacoby portrayed Judge Turpin in the 2005 revival musical.
Austin Kent played Judge Turpin in the 1980 London production.
Denis Quilley portrayed Judge Turpin in the London revival.
Will Roy portrayed Judge Turpin in the 1984 Houston Grand Opera/New York City Opera co-production

References

Characters in Sweeney Todd
Fictional judges
Fictional rapists
Literary characters introduced in 1973
Male literary villains
Male characters in film
Male horror film villains
Male film villains
Fictional child abusers
Fictional murdered people